Tazagyukh may refer to:
Tazagyukh, Ararat, Armenia
Tazagyugh, Gegharkunik, Armenia
Nor Gyugh, Armenia
Tasik, Armenia
Tavshut, Armenia